Udyotakara (or Uddyotakara) (c. 6th century CE) was a philosopher of the Nyaya school of Indian philosophy. Subandhu’s  mentioned him as the rescuer of the Nyaya. He was a brahmin of Bharadvaja gotra and he belonged to the Pashupata sect.

See also
 List of teachers of Nyaya

Notes

6th-century Indian philosophers
Indian logicians
Nyaya
6th-century Indian writers